The Armed Police Force, Nepal is a paramilitary land force tasked with counter-insurgency operations in Nepal. It functions as a semi-military wing, and occupies a sort of dual role as both military and law enforcement. Service is voluntary and the minimum age for enlistment is 18 years. Initially founded with a roster of 15,000 police and military personnel, the Armed Police Force is projected to have a corps of 77,117 at the close of 2015.

In February 1996, the ideologically Maoist Communist Party of Nepal operating as the United People's Front of Nepal initiated what was then dubbed the "People's War". Ensuing armed resistance and criminal activity escalating from the conflict motivated King Gyanendra to consider amassing an independent police force. Subsequently, the Armed Police Force was founded on 24 October 2001. Late Krishna Mohan Shrestha of the Nepal Police (then serving as Additional Inspector General of Police) was its first Chief.

The current command and control organization of Nepal's army is outlined along the protocol of the 1990 Constitution and its interim constitution. Its standing Inspector General is the Chief of Armed Police Forces, equivalent in rank to a three star Lieutenant General of the Nepal Army.

The fundamental ethos of the Armed Police Force (APF) is Peace, Security, Commitment.

History

The Armed Police Force, Nepal was founded in 2001 to help Nepal's army and civil police force counter a growing Maoist insurgency in Nepal. It was fundamentally a paramilitary organization and mostly engaged in counterinsurgency operations. In August 2003, five constables of the Armed Police Force were killed in a military operation in the Ramechapp District of Nepal which killed 39 Maoist rebels. In January 2003, the head of the Armed Police Force Inspector General Krishna Mohan Shrestha was shot and killed by Maoist insurgents while taking his morning walk, alongside his bodyguard and wife who were also killed.

Weaponry
 FN FAL
  M16

Current department and commander

Operations

In November 2001, the Nepalese armed forces began military operations against the Communist Party of Nepal (Maoist). And Armed Police Force was involved in this operations with the birth of its organization along with Nepal Army.

Allegations of war crimes and human rights abuses have been leveled by the media against members of the Armed Police Force. However, this is generally considered very small compared to the atrocities committed by the then Maoist insurgents. Truth and Reconciliation Commission(Nepal) under political pressure of the governing party has failed to take actions against the humans rights abusers on either sides.

Roles of Armed Police Force, Nepal 

 To control any ongoing or would be armed conflict within the country,
 To control any ongoing or would be armed rebellion or separatist activities within the country,
 To control any ongoing or would be terrorist activities within the country,
 To control any ongoing or would be riot within the country,
 To assist in rendering relief to natural calamity or epidemic victims,
 To rescue any citizen or else from hostage captivity or in the event of occurrence of heinous and serious crimes or unrest of grave nature or of anticipation,
 To guard border of the country,
 To assist under the Nepalese Army in condition of external invasion,
 To protect public vital installations, infrastructures and other facilities assigned by the Government of Nepal,
 To protect the personalities and public vital installations, institutes and other facilities considered to be given protection by the Government of Nepal,
 To perform tasks assigned as per this act and under its regulations or in accordance to other prevalent laws,
 To perform other tasks assigned from time to time by the Government of Nepal.
 To mobilize in customs, revenue and industrial security.

International peacekeeping missions

Armed Police Force contributes its soldiers in peacekeeping efforts under the coveted blue flag of the United Nations for global peace and security as a whole.

Since October 2002, Armed Police Force, Nepal has made contributions to various UN Peace Keeping Missions like UNGCI (Iraq), UNMIK (Kosovo), UNMIL (Liberia), UNAMSIL (Sierra Leone), MINUSTAH (Haiti), UNMIS & UNMISS (Sudan), UNAMID (Darfur), UNSOM (Somalia), UNMIT (East Timore) & UNFICYP (Cyprus) as a UN Police advisers, instructors, monitors and contingent.

6582 APF Personnel had already participated as a member of FPU contingent and 785 personnel have served as an Individual Police Officer (IPOs) until August 2018 in the United Nations Peace Keeping Missions.

See also
 Nepal Armed Police Force School
 APF Club
 National Investigation Department of Nepal
 Nepal Army
 Nepal Police
 Nepalese Armed Forces

References

External links
 Background Note: Nepal
 Nepal
 Official website of the Nepal Army
 Official website of the Armed Police Force of Nepal

Specialist law enforcement agencies of Nepal
Military of Nepal
 
Nepalese Civil War
2001 establishments in Nepal